Ferrari 308 refers to a 3-liter 8-cylinder Ferrari sports car, of which there were three different models:
 Ferrari GT4, a Bertone-styled 2+2 V8 successor to the Dino
 Ferrari 308 GTB/GTS, a Pininfarina-styled 2-seat version of the GT4
Ferrari 308 GT/M, a prototype racing car intended to compete in Group B rally racing.